Til We Meet Again is a 1940 romance film directed by Edmund Goulding and Anatole Litvak and starring Merle Oberon and George Brent as two doomed, star-crossed lovers. It is a remake of the 1932 film One Way Passage and itself was remade into the 1954 Mexican 3-D film El valor de vivir.

Plot
Total strangers Dan Hardesty and Joan Ames meet by chance in a crowded bar in Hong Kong when she admires the "Paradise cocktail" that Dan has just concocted. He asks for another glass and pours half of his drink into it. After they drink, he breaks off the bowl of his glass and places the stem on the bar; she follows suit, and he helps her to place the stem of her glass across his. Dan leaves the bar and is promptly handcuffed by Lieutenant Steve Burke of the San Francisco police. Burke has spent a year chasing Dan, a convicted murderer who jumped off a train on his way to San Quentin to be hanged.

He takes Dan to an ocean liner for the journey to San Francisco. As they are boarding, Dan jumps into the water (with Steve still handcuffed to him). He takes the key to the handcuffs from Steve's pocket and frees himself. He starts to swim away, but turns back to rescue non-swimmer Steve before making his getaway. Dan is recaptured and put aboard the ship.

"Rocky" Rockingham T. Rockingham (Frank McHugh, reprising his role in One Way Passage) scrambles aboard at the last minute. Joan is also a passenger. When she collapses, the ship's doctor learns of her fatal heart condition, but she plans to keep going "around the little world."

Once they are underway, Steve allows Dan the freedom of the ship. In the bar, Dan encounters Rocky, an old friend, and asks for his help. Joan enters the bar, shares another Paradise with Dan, and their courtship begins.

Also aboard is another of Dan's old friends, the "Comtesse de Bresac". The Comtesse is actually Liz, a con artist trained by Dan when she was young. She is still a little in love with him. When she learns of Dan's predicament, she keeps a smitten Steve occupied and secretly empties his gun of bullets. A romance develops between the mismatched pair.

As they near Honolulu, Steve overhears Joan and Dan plan to spend the next day ashore. He takes Dan to the brig. Dan picks up a bottle to knock him out, but Steve shoots it (he had checked his gun and reloaded it). Liz slips Steve some sleeping pills and frees Dan. When he is spotted by Joan, he postpones his "business" to go on their outing. Later, on the way back, Dan stops the rented car before they reach the pier. However, when Joan collapses, Dan carries her back aboard. The ship's doctor tells Dan about Joan's prognosis. Liz tells a stunned Dan that he still has time to get away. From the doorway, Steve says, "No, he doesn't."

On the last night, everyone on shipboard is partying. Liz asks Burke why he has been avoiding her since Honolulu. He reveals that he got a cable about her. She tries to bribe him, to no avail. However, he is still attracted to her, saying there is less room between a cop and a countess than a cop and a con. In the bar, Dan and Joan bid each other goodbye, sharing one last Paradise cocktail and promising to meet in Mexico City at the Palace Bar on New Year's Eve.

The next morning in San Francisco, the assistant purser tips a newspaper reporter that Dan spent a lot of time with Joan. The reporter tricks his way into Joan's stateroom and reveals Dan's fate to her. Frantic, she rushes out and finds Dan on deck. They bid each other goodbye, each concealing what they know about the other.

In the Palace Bar in Mexico City, the crowd is celebrating New Year's. Two bartenders hear the sound of glass breaking and turn to find a pair of glasses with the stems crossed on the bar.

Production 
The film was based on the story by Robert Lord that was the basis for One Way Passage. Lord won an Academy Award in 1933 in the category Best Writing, Original Story for the earlier film.

The same basic musical theme is used in both films. Leo F. Forbstein, Music Director on this film, was Vitaphone Orchestra Conductor for One Way Passage. Ray Heindorf did the orchestral arrangements.

Reception 
Variety staff praised the film, observing that although it was a remake, it "still has plenty of sock left" and that the two leads did "an excellent job. Oberon's sincere and eye-filling performance equals that of her predecessor in the role, while Brent comes within at least a shade of Powell's superb portrayal."

The New York Times critic Benjamin Crisler disagreed, writing, "It may be that quite a number of people, touched by the synthetic tragedy of it, will mistake 'Til We Meet Again' for art, but the fact remains that it is just a very sad remake of 'One Way Passage.

Cast
 Merle Oberon as Joan Ames
 George Brent as Dan Hardesty
 Pat O'Brien as Police Lieutenant Steve Burke
 Geraldine Fitzgerald as Bonny Coburn, a newlywed fellow passenger and friend of Joan's
 Binnie Barnes as la Comtesse de Bresac
 Frank McHugh as Rockingham T. Rockingham
 Eric Blore as Sir Harold Pinchard, a shipboard victim of the Comtesse and Rockingham
 Henry O'Neill as Dr. Cameron, the ship's doctor
 George Reeves as Jimmy Coburn, Bonny's husband
 Frank Wilcox as Frank, Assistant Purser
 Doris Lloyd as Louise, Joan's maid

References

External links
 
 
 

1940 films
1940 romantic drama films
Remakes of American films
American romantic drama films
American black-and-white films
1940s English-language films
Films about capital punishment
Films directed by Edmund Goulding
Films directed by William K. Howard 
Films set on ships
Films set around New Year
Warner Bros. films
Films with screenplays by Robert Lord (screenwriter)
1940s American films